The Kenite hypothesis (also called the Midianite hypothesis) proposes that the origins of Yahweh, and by extension Yahwism, do not lie in Canaan as the Hebrew Bible describes, but instead originated in the area immediately south of the Levant, possibly extending far into the northwest Arabian Peninsula, on the east shore of the Gulf of Aqaba on the Red Sea, in the area the Tanakh calls "Midian". The theory states that Yahweh originally was a Midianite deity, who made his way up north to the proto-Israelites.

History
Friedrich Wilhelm Ghillany in 1862 was the first to propose that Yahweh had originally made his home in what was historically known as the kingdom of Edom (the area immediately south of the Dead Sea), citing for evidence numerous passages where the deity is described as coming from southern lands. 
A decade later, a similar theory was independently espoused by Cornelis Petrus Tiele, and more fully by Bernhard Stade (1887). 
The hypothesis in the form it currently takes was more completely worked out by Karl Budde; and later was accepted by H. Guthe, Gerrit Wildeboer, Henry Preserved Smith, and George Aaron Barton.

The Kenite hypothesis became widely accepted in the scholarship of the late 19th and the 20th century. 
Notable German scholars who endorsed it include Eduard Meyer, Bernhard Stade, Karl Budde,
and Hugo Gressmann, while anglophone supporters include George Aaron Barton, Thomas Kelly Cheyne and Henry Preserved Smith.
The theory was nevertheless  controversially discussed throughout the 20th century and had numerous detractors, 
notably Theophile James Meek, Frederick Winnett, Martin Buber and Roland de Vaux,
besides Gorden (1907), Konig (1912), Kittel (1917), Volz (1947), and Procksch (1950).

More recently, Blenkinsopp (2008) revisiting the available evidence concludes that "this hypothesis provides the best explanation currently
available of the relevant literary and archaeological data". By contrast
Tebes (2021), focusing on extra-biblical evidence from the Southern Levant and Northern Arabia, presents the "Midianite" influence on Canaan
as a drawn-out process of cultural transmission taking place during the 10th to 6th centuries BCE.

Basic model
The Kenite hypothesis rests on four bases: an interpretation of the biblical texts dealing with the Midianite connections of Moses, allusions in ancient poetic compositions to the original residence of Yahweh, Egyptian topographical texts from the fourteenth to the twelfth century, and Cain as the eponymous ancestor of the Kenites.

Critical examination of the narrative of Moses meeting Jethro and the events that unfolded thereafter comprise the first support of the Kenite theory. Moses, son of Levitical parents but adopted into the family of the Pharaoh, murders an Egyptian slavemaster for harshly beating an Israelite slave. To escape punishment, he flees to the land of Midian, where he rescues a Midianite woman named Zipporah and her sisters from belligerents taking water from their well. As his reward, he takes Zipporah as his wife and lives long enough in Midian to have two sons with her. During this time he was in service with his father-in-law, a priest (perhaps the priest) of Midian, named both Reuel and Jethro. At a sacred spot, a "mountain of God", situated beyond the normal pasturage of the Midianites but apparently frequented by Midianites nonetheless, Moses received a revelation from a deity previously known to him only notionally, if at all, presumably a deity worshipped by Midianites considering the pre-existing sacrality of the mountain, whose name was revealed to be Yahweh. Later on, after having led the Israelites out of Egyptian captivity, Moses finds himself back at the sacred mount, and Jethro comes to him, having heard about Yahweh's great feats. The two enter a tent with Joshua and Moses recounts the great deeds of Yahweh, and Jethro blesses the deity, proclaiming Him like no other. The passage in question can be interpreted two ways: Jethro either acknowledges Yahweh as superior to his own (unmentioned) gods and converts to the Israelite religion on the spot, or celebrates the demonstration of Yahweh's might and reaffirms the implied Midianite faith to him. The general interpretation is the former; that Jethro, a non-Jew, recognized the true God in Yahweh, the God of Israel, and pays him homage. Proponents of the Kenite hypothesis, on the other hand, interpret the passage as the latter; that Jethro expresses to his proud joy that the God he and his people already worshipped, Yahweh, has proved himself mightier than all other gods. Thus, rather than Jethro's conversion to Yahwism, the passage actually shows the first incorporation of the Israelite leaders into the worship of Yahweh.

The connection of the Midianites to the Kenites is made somewhat conjecturally. "Jethro" is only one of many names the Torah and later books of the Tanakh ascribe to Moses' father-in-law. He is first called "Reuel" when he is introduced in Exodus 2:18, however for the remainder of the Book of Exodus he is only referred to as "Jethro". In both the Book of Numbers and the Book of Judges, Moses' father-in-law is called neither "Jethro" or "Reuel", but "Hobab". Several unsatisfactory attempts at harmonization have been made: that Hobab and Jethro are alternative names for the same person, that Jethro/Hobab is the son of Reuel, which requires that in Exodus 2:16 "father" (Hebrew:  ʾāḇ) means "grandfather" (ʾāḇ can also mean "male ancestor") and in Exodus 2:18 "daughter" (Hebrew:  bat) means "granddaughter" (bat can also mean "female descendant"), that Hobab is actually the brother-in-law of Moses and the reading of "father-in-law" in the Book of Numbers and the Book of Judges are the result of a scribal error (the Hebrew words for "brother-in-law" and "father-in-law" are spelled the same —  — but pronounced differently, ḵātān vs. ḵōtēn, respectively), or that the name "Reuel" was simply inserted into Exodus 2 by a scribe for whatever reason. Proponents of the Kenite hypothesis explain the discrepancy as follows: since clan names and place names have a much better chance of survival in the collective memory than personal names, the most probable, if partial, solution is that "Reuel" is the name of the clan or lineage to which Hobab belonged. In the Book of Genesis, "Reuel" is listed as one of the sons of Esau — i.e. as an Edomite tribe — and is also the name attached to a group of confederate clans. In the same lists, a clan known as Ithran is also mentioned. Later, in the Second Book of Samuel and the First Book of Chronicles, two Ishmaelite (Arabian) names, Jithra and Jether, are mentioned. Ithran, Jithra, and Jether are all considered variants of the name Jithro — that is, Jethro. Because of this, William F. Albright asserted that the father-in-law and Midianite priest was indeed Jethro, and that Hobab was Moses’ brother-in-law, a member of the Reuel clan, and a metalsmith by profession.

Early Yahwistic poetry is the next base of support for the Kenite hypothesis. On five separate occasions, Yahweh is given explicit residency in the lands south of the biblical Kingdom of Judah. These passages are Deuteronomy 33:2, Judges 5:4, Habakkuk 3:3 and 3:7, and Isaiah 63:1. Each passage describes Yahweh as having come forth from the lands of Midian and Edom, sometimes in specific places such as Bozrah, Mount Seir, and Mount Paran, and sometimes in generic terms where the deity is described as coming from Teman, a word literally meaning "south." Mount Seir, in particular, became a synonym for the Edomites both inside and outside the Hebrew Bible, the Amarna letters mention a "people of Shēri", and a 13th-century BCE topographical list made by Rameses II in West Amāra mentions the "Shasu of Seir". The text of the Blessing of Moses and the Song of Deborah seem to quote each other, depending on which was written first, and while both say Yahweh shone forth from Mount Paran, the Blessing of Moses is unique in that it specifically mentions that Yahweh actually came from Mount Sinai. Proponents of the Kenite hypothesis explain this by citing evidence of text corruption in the passage. The passage in question, Deuteronomy 33:2, reads as follows:

The Hebrew term "" is a hapax legomenon, it does not occur anywhere else in the Hebrew Bible, or anywhere else in the entire corpus of the Hebrew language throughout history. Jewish scholars explained this puzzling word by deeming it an esoteric compound of the Hebrew words ʾeš (fire) and dāṯ (law), thus yielding "fierly Law". However, proponents of the Kenite hypothesis instead claim that the word is not a compound at all, but a deliberate alteration of the word "", a variation of the name Asherah, the goddess who was worshipped as Yahweh's consort in the early centuries of the Israelite kingdoms. Taking a step further, they postulate that the reference of "holy myriads" (mērīḇəḇōṯ qōḏeš) is actually an alteration of the place-name "Meribath-Kadesh" (mərīḇaṯ qāḏēš), which is placed in the vicinity of Paran by Numbers 13:26. Thus, "He appeared from Mount Paran and came with some of the holy myriads; from His right hand was a fiery Law for them." becomes the equally coherent "He appeared from Mount Paran and came to Meribath-Kadesh; from His right hand was his Asherah." Furthermore, tablets from Kuntillet Ajrud blesses its recipient "by Yahweh of Teman and his Asherah" — connecting the Tanakh verses linking Yahweh to Teman and his consort Asherah. Therefore, it is concluded that the point of departure for Yahweh's triumphal going forth, and therefore his original residence among his devotees, is that part of Edom (Seir, Teman) which lay west of the Arabah. According to the biblical texts, this was the country of the Kenites.

The possibility has also been entertained that the biblical version of the history of early humanity has preserved, in the story of Cain and his line (Gen. 4:1-24), an echo of the role of the Kenites in the early history of Israel. The name of the tribe, Kenite, is derived from Cain's name. The Kenites, like Cain, were nomadic. The Kenites were metalworkers, a science which the Book of Genesis states the descendants of Cain invented. Immediately after Cain is expelled to the wilderness by Yahweh for Abel's murder, the biblical narrative states that in the times of the children of Adam and Eve's new son, Seth, people began to call on Yahweh's name for the first time. However, Yahweh states during the episode of the burning bush that his name, Yahweh, was not known to previous generations. Proponents of the Kenite hypothesis explain this inconsistency as a preserved implication that the cult of Yahweh said to have been created by Moses had a known pre-history. Further indirect support for the Kenites being the true bearers of the Yahwistic faith is taken from the positive portrayal of Kenites in the rest of the Tanakh. Kenites and some groups closely associated with them appear to have been known as fervid devotees of their god Yahweh, even during times when Yahweh's own chosen people, the Israelites, had at large abandoned his worship. Together with Othniel and Jerahmeel, Caleb is a Kenizzite, and therefore closely related to the Kenites. In the narratives about the settlement in Canaan, Caleb is prominent for his religious zeal. He is the one who, after the initial reconnoitring of the land, urges immediate attack, and is approved of as possessing "a different spirit". His brother Othniel, one of the Judges, saved Israel after Yahweh's spirit came upon him. Jael, killer of Sisera, and for that reason declared to be ‘most blessed of women’, was one of the Kenites who migrated to the north and settled near Kedesh in Naphthali. The Rechabites, first heard of during the reign of Jehu but who were certainly in existence much earlier, were fanatical Yahwists who rejected the culture of Canaan, even to the extent of living in tents and eschewing intoxicants, were also of Kenite stock according to 1 Chronicles 2:55. These examples lend to speculation as to what other expressions of what might be called a sort-of Yahwistic primitivism, for which no obvious explanation is at hand, may be relics of the aboriginal, pre-Israelite Yahwism associated with the Kenites and related groups.

Criticism

The Kenite hypothesis is not without its faults. A Midianite–Kenite origin for the Yahweh cult has obvious implications for ethnic origins, specifically the origins of Judah, and raises the further question of how this cult came to be adopted by the early Israelite settlers in the central Palestinian highlands. The theory postulated that the Judahites were part of an Arabian trade league of numerous clans that ended up migrating north to Palestine, however in the 250 years that have passed since this explanation was offered, a number of genetic and archeological studies have concluded that the people that would become the Israelites originated in Canaan.

Other critics disagree with the attribution of the Kenites to Cain. A. H. Sayce, for instance, points out the Hebrew form of the singular "Kenite" (Hebrew: קֵינִי Qeiniy), is identical or strikingly similar to Aramaic words meaning "smith", an etymology which forgoes the implied connection of metallurgy to Cain and his descendants and instead attaches it directly and unambiguously to the craft. The definition of the term Qinim as "metalsmiths" or "people of Qayin" are equally coherent.

Others disagree with the theory's reliance on a supposed historical basis for the narratives of Moses. Most scholars, while retaining the possibility that a Moses-like figure existed in the 13th century BCE, agree that Moses, as portrayed by the Tanakh, is a legendary figure. There is also the issue of the timeframe of the narratives' composition. The general consensus, despite the collapse of the Documentary hypothesis, is that the Book of Exodus was compiled around 600 BCE and finalized by 400 BCE, 800-1000 years after Moses would have existed and the Exodus would have occurred. However, this does not preclude the idea that Moses and the Exodus were pre-existing motifs in Israelite thought — the narratives were certainly based on extensive oral tradition, the age of which cannot reasonably be determined with any veracity. But even still, this was not uniform. The northern prophets Amos and Hosea draw on the Exodus in their preachings, meanwhile of the southern prophets contemporary to them, Micah and Isaiah, only Micah mentions the Exodus, only doing so briefly. However, the southern Israelites weren't completely ignorant of the apparently ancient Exodus narrative, as they are featured at length in Psalm 78 and Psalm 114, and Moses is mentioned by name in Psalm 77, Psalm 90, Psalm 99, and Psalm 105, as well as by Jeremiah. Even still, this is a strong indication that the Exodus narrative was vastly more developed in the setting of the northern kingdom than the southern kingdom, which raises the question of how a people could have realistically allowed knowledge of such a central and holy piece of their own history to be divided by political borders. The story of the Exodus may, therefore, have originated only a few centuries earlier, perhaps in the 9th or 10th centuries BCE, and taken different forms in Israel and Judah. Combined with the strong consensus among scholars that the Exodus narrative is largely legendary, it spells problems for the largest beam of support for the Kenite hypothesis.

For these reasons, among others, many scholars outright reject the Kenite hypothesis.

References

Kenites
Biblical studies
Religion in ancient Israel and Judah
Midian
Ancient Semitic religions